Edward Vaughn Long (July 18, 1908November 6, 1972) was a United States Senator from Missouri and a member of the Democratic Party. He served in the United States Senate from 1960 until 1968. One of his most notable accomplishments as a US Senator writing the final draft of the Freedom of Information Act which passed in 1966 after 11 years of research, creation, and fight by the "Father of the Freedom of Information Act", Representative John E. Moss (D) of Sacramento, California.

Biography 
Born in rural Lincoln County, Missouri near Whiteside, he was educated at Culver-Stockton College and the University of Missouri.

After holding various local offices in Bowling Green and Pike County, Long was elected to the Missouri State Senate, where he served from 1945 to 1955; he was elected majority floor leader in 1952 and President pro tempore in 1955.

In his first statewide race, he was elected the Lieutenant Governor of Missouri in 1956, serving from 1957 until his appointment in 1960 by Governor James T. Blair Jr. to the Senate seat made vacant by the death of Thomas C. Hennings Jr. He won election to the Senate in his own right in 1962, but lost a primary challenge to Thomas Eagleton in 1968, and resigned his seat on December 27 of that year, resuming his law practice in Missouri. Long voted in favor of the Civil Rights Acts of 1964 and 1968, as well as the 24th Amendment to the U.S. Constitution, the Voting Rights Act of 1965, and the confirmation of Thurgood Marshall to the U.S. Supreme Court.

On November 6, 1972, Long died unexpectedly at the age of 64. Five months later, his personal secretary told prosecutors in Clarksville, Missouri, that he had told her that he believed that he had been poisoned by candy which had been sent to him in the mail, although no box of candy was found later in the home, which had been broken into two days after his death. No charges were ever filed arising from Long's death. Long's widow filed a $3.25 million lawsuit against the secretary on the same day of the report to police.

Long is buried in Grand View Burial Park, Hannibal, Missouri.

References 

1908 births
1972 deaths
Culver–Stockton College alumni
Democratic Party United States senators from Missouri
Lieutenant Governors of Missouri
Democratic Party Missouri state senators
People from Lincoln County, Missouri
Politicians from St. Louis
Presidents pro tempore of the Missouri Senate
University of Missouri alumni
20th-century American politicians
People from Bowling Green, Missouri